Scantec Personnel is a recruitment agency in the UK, and is now ranked 9th within the Top 20 UK Technical Recruitment Agencies. Founded in 1990, in 2007 Scantec relocated to a larger office in Twelve Quays, Wirral.

History
Launched in 1990, Scantec originally focused on recruitment within the petrochemical, mechanical, pharmaceutical and civil industries, carrying out recruitment for Unilever and Quest International.

In 1995 the company won a five-year contract with the Atomic Weapons Establishment, and since then Scantec has also expanded into oil and gas, scientific, architectural and construction sectors.

Management
John Robinson and Peter Bates are the two directors of Scantec, and have been since the business’ inception in 1990.

References

External links
Official Website
Gulf Jobs Website
Jobs Opportunities

Business services companies established in 1990
Employment agencies of the United Kingdom
1990 establishments in England